Zhu Changqing (died 1649), Prince of Huai (淮王), courtesy name Xiaxin (霞新), was claimed to be regent of the Southern Ming from 1648 to 1649. His regime name was Dongwu (東武), which means "east valiant".

Dongwu got full support from Koxinga (Zheng Chenggong), a famous and powerful warlord during that time. Dongwu's & Koxinga's power was based on Guandong and Fujian province.

Dongwu died in 1649 and was succeeded by Prince of Gui with the era name "Yongli" (永曆). According to the history book, he has no temple name.

References 

 Struve, Lynn (1988). "The Southern Ming." In Cambridge History of China, Volume 7, The Ming Dynasty, 1368-1644 - Part 1, ed. by Frederic W. Mote, Denis Twitchett, and John King Fairbank, pp. 641–725. Cambridge: Cambridge University Press.

1649 deaths
17th-century Chinese monarchs
Southern Ming emperors
Year of birth unknown